San Bartolomé (Spanish meaning Saint Bartholomew) is a town and municipality in the Canary Islands (Spain) situated in the centre of the island of Lanzarote. The municipality of San Bartolomé stretches to the southeastern coast of the island.

Its altitude is 240 metres above sea level.

The town is located northwest of Arrecife, the island's capital, to which it is connected by the LZ-20 road. The municipality lies southwest of Teguise, southeast of Tinajo, which includes the Timanfaya National Park, and northeast of Tías. The municipality also includes the coastal town of Playa Honda to its southeast, located between Arrecife and Lanzarote Airport.

Most of the inhabitants work as craftsmen, farmers or in the service for tourism which is the biggest economic factor on Lanzarote.

References

External links
Council website

Municipalities in Lanzarote
Populated places in Lanzarote